"The Great Divide" is the second single by American singer Scott Stapp, released on September 26, 2005. The song was later included on Stapp's debut solo album of the same name, released on November 22, 2005. It and Stapp's song "You Will Soar" served as WWE's fourth annual Tribute to the Troops theme songs on December 11, 2006.

Charts

References

 

2005 singles
Scott Stapp songs
2005 songs
Wind-up Records singles
Songs written by Scott Stapp